Tistrella bauzanensis is a Gram-positive, strictly aerobic, rod-shaped and motile bacterium from the genus of Tistrella which has been isolated from soil from Bozen in Italy. Tistrella bauzanensis produces didemnin B.

References

Rhodospirillales
Bacteria described in 2011